Chřibská is a town in Děčín District in the Ústí nad Labem Region of the Czech Republic. It has about 1,300 inhabitants.

Administrative parts
Chřibská is made up of town parts of Chřibská, Dolní Chřibská and Horní Chřibská, and of the village of Krásné Pole.

Geography

Most of the municipal territory of Chřibská is located in the Lusatian Mountains and the eponymous protected landscape area. A small river Chřibská Kamenice flows through the territory.

History
The first written mentioned of Chřibská is from 1352. It was located at the trading road from Bohemia to the Lusatia. It became part of the possessions of the family of Wartenberg from Děčín, and in 1614 of the Kinsky family. Town rights had been granted in 1570, and in 1596 a militia was founded for defense.

Until 1918, Kreibitz was part of the Austrian monarchy (Austria side after the compromise of 1867), in the Rumburg (Rumburk) District, one of the 94 Bezirkshauptmannschaften in Bohemia.
Along with other parts of the former Austrian Empire, Chřibská became part of Czechoslovakia in 1919. From 1938, after the Munich Agreement regarding the Sudetenland, until 1945, Chřibská was part of Varnsdorf District.

The expulsion of Germans after World War II in 1945–1946 reduced the population.

Since 10 October 2006 Chřibská is a town again.

Economy
The oldest running glass production in Europe is located in Horní Chřibská. It was founded shortly after 1500 by the German-Bohemian glass-maker family Friedrich.

Sights
The landmark of Chřibská is the Church of Saint George. The original Gothic church was rebuilt in the Renaissance style in 1596. Later it was modified in the Gothic style again, and two Baroque chapels were added.

Notable people
Thaddäus Haenke (1761–1816), botanist and explorer

References

External links

History of Chřibská 
Virtual show

Cities and towns in the Czech Republic
Populated places in Děčín District
Lusatian Mountains